
Karl Löwrick (8 November 1894 – 8 April 1945) was a German general in the Wehrmacht during World War II, and a recipient of the Knight's Cross of the Iron Cross with Oak Leaves of Nazi Germany. Löwrick was killed on 8 April 1945 in an accident in Pillau.

Awards and decorations
 Iron Cross (1914) 2nd Class (9 May 1915) & 1st Class (18 September 1917)
 Clasp to the Iron Cross (1939) 2nd Class (14 June 1940) &1st Class (20 June 1940)
 Knight's Cross of the Iron Cross with Oak Leaves
 Knight's Cross on 5 August 1940 as Oberstleutnant and commander of III./Infanterie-Regiment 272
 247th Oak Leaves on 17 May 1943 as Oberst and commander of Grenadier-Regiment 272

References

Citations

Bibliography

 
 

1894 births
1945 deaths
People from Kętrzyn County
Lieutenant generals of the German Army (Wehrmacht)
German Army personnel of World War I
German police officers
Recipients of the clasp to the Iron Cross, 1st class
Recipients of the Knight's Cross of the Iron Cross with Oak Leaves
People from East Prussia
German Army personnel killed in World War II
Accidental deaths in Germany
German Army generals of World War II